The Cedars may refer to:

Places

United Kingdom
 The Cedars, Sunninghill, a Grade II listed house in Sunninghill, Berkshire

United States
 The Cedars, California, an unincorporated community
 The Cedars (Columbus, Georgia), listed on the National Register of Historic Places (NRHP) in Muscogee County
 The Cedars (Washington, Georgia), NRHP-listed in Wilkes County
 The Cedars (Franklin, Kentucky), NRHP-listed in Simpson County
 The Cedars (Leitchfield, Kentucky), NRHP-listed in Grayson County
 The Cedars (Clinton, Mississippi), NRHP-listed in Hinds County
 The Cedars (Columbus, Mississippi), NRHP-listed in Lowndes County
 The Cedars (Starkville, Mississippi), NRHP-listed in Oktibbeha County
 The Cedars (Hendersonville, North Carolina), NRHP-listed in Henderson County
 The Cedars (Murfreesboro, North Carolina), NRHP-listed in Hertford County
 The Cedars (Beech Island, South Carolina), NRHP-listed in South Carolina
 The Cedars (Jackson, Tennessee), NRHP-listed in Madison County
 The Cedars (Dallas, Texas), a historic neighborhood in Dallas
 The Cedars (Greenwood, Virginia), NRHP-listed in Albemarle County
 The Cedars (Arlington, VA), US lobbying headquarters for The Fellowship (Christian organization)

Other 
 The Cedars Academy, a secondary school in Birstall, Leicestershire, England
 The Cedars School, an independent school in Croydon, Greater London, England
 The Cedars, a name for Cedars of God area in Lebanon
 Battle of the Cedars (1776), American Revolutionary War skirmish
 Les Cèdres, Quebec, location of the above skirmish
 Guardians of the Cedars, Lebanese political party
 Trail of the Cedars, Glacier National Park, Montana
 Treaty of the Cedars (1836), Wisconsin

See also 
 Cedars (disambiguation)
 Cedar (disambiguation)